The Seedwings Europe Kestrel is an Austrian high-wing, single-place, hang glider that was designed and produced by Seedwings Europe of Schlitters. Now out of production, when it was available the aircraft was supplied complete and ready-to-fly.

Design and development
The Kestrel was designed as an intermediate-level hang glider with an emphasis on a light empty weight, easy rigging and good performance. It is made from aluminum tubing, with the double-surface wing covered in Dacron sailcloth. The nose angle is 129° for all models.

The models are each DHV2 certified and are named for their rough wing area in square feet.

Variants
Kestrel 133
Small-sized model for lighter pilots. Its  span wing is cable braced from a single kingpost.
Kestrel 148
Mid-sized model for medium-weight pilots. Its  span wing is cable braced from a single kingpost.
Kestrel 158
Large-sized model for heavier pilots. Its  span wing is cable braced from a single kingpost.

Specifications (Kestrel 133)

References

Kestrel
Hang gliders